Brahmarakshas  is an Indian Hindi-language supernatural thriller television series broadcast on Zee TV and digitally available on ZEE5. Spanning two seasons, it is a franchise produced by Ekta Kapoor under her studio Balaji Telefilms.

The first season titled Brahmarakshas... Jaag Utha Shaitan starring Krystle D'Souza and Aham Sharma aired from 6 August 2016 to 18 February 2017. It was loosely based on fantasy thriller film, Jaani Dushman and the western fairy tale, Beauty and the Beast.

The second season titled Brahmarakshas 2: Phir Jaag Utha Shaitan starring Pearl V Puri and Nikki Sharma aired from 22 November 2020 and 4 April 2021.

Series overview

Plot

Season 1
A small village named Kamalpura's landlord Sanjay thakur marries Aparajita. On their wedding night, she betrays him and pushes him off a cliff for his wealth. Attacked by a gorilla, Sanjay Thakur's soul is enchanted into the animal's body converting him into a Brahmrakshas (a demon). He is angered whenever he sees brides with bridal jewellery and vermilion, and kills them as it reminds him of Aparajita.

Twenty years later

In Mumbai, a family decides to conduct destination wedding for their daughter, Rakhi at Kamalpura. Rakhi is close to her best friend Raina and easy-go-lucky flirting brother Rishabh. The whole family leaves for Kamalpura.

Learning that Rakhi loves someone else, Raina and Rishabh secretly has them married. Sanjay kills Varun and then Rakhi as well. Left shattered, Rishabh and Raina decide to seek revenge from Sanjay. Raina and Rishabh marry in order to bring Brahmrakshas in front of them and kills him.

Aparjita returns to Kamalpura. Raina discovers that Aparajita is Rishabh's "Appu maa", Mohini's best friend and is very close to Rishabh. She also finds out that she is not her father's real daughter. Her parents were the first couple who had been killed by Sanjay and a baby Raina is given to a man by Phuli. Raina reveals the truth to Rishabh, however he refuses to believe Raina. But soon Aparajita's truth is discovered. A dangerous animal kills Aparajita and she becomes another Brahmrakshas. Aparajita is murdered by Sanjay, who comes under Mohini's control.

Rishabh's brother Yug learns that Mohini is Rishabh's chachi. His wife Naina learns this but is tied and locked in the house basement, where Rishabh's real mother Sudha is found. Mohini takes Sudha to Asursthal to kill her but Raina brings her back.  Wanting to awake Narsimha, Mohini takes Raina and Rishabh along with her; they learn her truth.

Mohini loses a Narsimha stone, which breaks. Due to its emitting intense light, the stone captures Rishabh into the stone. Mohini snatches it but is killed by Sanjay. While dying, she reveals to Raina about Narsimha. Rishabh comes out of the stone and notices changes in himself. Narsimha enters into his body. Sanjay gains more powers and kills Naina. Sanjay and Narsimha fight.

As Sanjay takes the gem containing Narsimha's power, he throws it but Raina finds and gets it. She grabs the sword and stabs Sanjay who finally dies. Raina and Rishabh reunited.

Season 2 
Raghav and Vishakha organized a Diwali and birthday party for their daughter Kalindi. Raghav's best friend Shakti Mehra and his wife with son Angad going to London for his business expansion. Raghav's loyal person Prithvi and his wife Shalini want money and jewelry from Kali Mandir. Akshay appoint a Tantrik Jwala, he wants Kalindi's horoscope when they gave her horoscope, he become extremely happy as he found that girl who will help him to become immortal lifelong. He gave order to them to bring this girl right now but they send Komal not Kalindi but Jwala recognize that she is not that girl. Raghav call Balan to take Kalindi with her but he joins hands with Prithvi for money and give Kalindi to him. In anger Jwala roped off Prithvi, Balan and Akshay from the pillar. Raghav feels not good so he went to Kali Mandir and he sees all as soon as Kalindi's sacrifice Pooja was going to end. He says to Jwala stop this pooja but he also roped off from the pillar then he looked at Prithvi and Akshay asked him, what are you doing here, you guys were at home and where did you get the key of the vault of the temple. They told him they want jewelry and money from Kali Mandir. Raghav starts praying to Kali Maa to stop this evil work as soon as Jwala runs away but killed by Brahmarakshas and soul of Jwala gets transferred to him. Here Prithvi and Shalini kill Raghav and Vishakha and take her daughters.

16 years later 
All grown up, Kalindi and Minty live with Prithvi bearing taunts from Shalini and her daughters. Kalindi is shown to be a mature woman who feels indebted to Prithvi assuming that he is clearing her father's debts, unbeknownst to his involvement in her parents' death. Prithvi pulls a facade of a loving uncle to Kalindi and Minty in hopes of getting all of Kalindi's property. Angad is now a London based businessman along with his father and a soccer player, shown to be a casanova. The Mehras return to India on Shakti's insistence to get his sons married to Raghav's daughters which is not well taken by his wife, Damini. Prithvi and Shalini lie to Shakti that Kalindi died not long after her parents' death and that Minty is married. They convince Shakti to get his sons married to the former's daughters while Angad is smitten with Kalindi, assuming her to be one of Prithvi's three daughters. Brahmarakshas possesses Vardhaan Choudary, a well known businessman, and searches for Kalindi. He finds her soon and tries many ways to woo her and later asks her hand in marriage by making her believe that he will help her find the secret of Brahmarakshas to which Kalindi agrees. On learning this Angad is heartbroken and tries many tactics to cancel the wedding but is unsuccessful. Later on the wedding day Prithvi and Shalini tries to kill Kalindi but are unsure as Angad saves her but brahmarakshas renders Angad unconscious and kidnaps Kalindi and tries to wed her when she is unconscious but Angad comes at right time and saves her and informs her of Vardhaan being the Brahmarakshas and she vanquishes brahmaraksas and kills Gehna.

2 months later 
Brahmarakshas is revealed to be alive. Angad and Paridhi's haldi ceremony takes place. Madan comes out of the coma. The Brahmarakshas wreaks havoc again. Kalindi and Angad get Madan home. Angad gets jealous seeing Madan and Kalindi getting closer. The inspector learns something suspicious about Madan. Later, Kalindi seeks Madan's help. Angad gets a doubt on Madan. The incident at the mall raises Angad's suspicion on Madan. When the coconut turns black, Shalini thinks that Prithvi is Brahmarakshas. Brahmarakshas kills Inspector Shabana and Angad vows to expose the truth. Mahamaya Ma tells Shalini that Brahmarakshas is in the house. Angad summons Brahmarakshas and inadvertently saves Balan's life. Later, in a trance, Balan conveys Brahmarakshas's message and tries to kill Prithvi. Angad tries to explain to Kalindi that Madan is Brahmarakshas. Angad learns that Uma is his childhood friend Kalindi. Later, Kalindi learns Prithvi's truth and rushes to save Madan. Madan is saved by Kalindi but Brahmarakshas appears. Meanwhile, Damini stops Angad's marriage with Paridhi and shows everyone a video of Paridhi and Sid together, surprising everyone. Angad leaves the wedding and goes to find Kalindi and saves her from the Brahmarakshas. It is then revealed that After the trio return home, Prithvi fakes getting a heart attack and told everyone that Uma is Kalindi and that Kalindi should marry Angad and the preparation for Angad and Kalindi's starts. Meanwhile, Madan tells Kalindi not to marry Angad as Brahmarakshas could take anyone's form and he could take Angad's form and marry her so its not safe for her. Angad, Kalindi, Minty, Robin, Sakshi and Paridhi go for a picnic in the jungle. Where Paridhi learns of Kalindi's plan of leaving her wedding with Angad and marrying Madan. Paridhi agrees to help her by taking her place at the wedding with Angad. Angad realises the truth and goes to stop Madan and Kalindi's wedding. Brahmarakshas appears and wounds Madan but Kalindi manages to kill Brahmarakshas and Madan dies as well. Then Brahmarakshas is shown jumping out of the fire and is revealed to be alive. Prithvi tells Kalindi that Vikram is guilty of Raghav's death. Kalindi's words hurt Minty and she leaves the house for Robin. A revelation about Robin takes place, he is revealed as Brahmarakshas. Vikram dies by burning in front of everyone. Prithvi and Shalini go to a tantric. Kalindi gives consent to Robin and Minty's relationship and their Roka ceremony takes place. Later, Kalindi uses the solution given in the book to identify Brahmarakshas. Brahmarakshas saves Kalindi from the tantric. Kalindi learns that Robin is Brahmarakshas. Later, when the news of Brahamarakshas' death is broadcast on TV, Kalindi does not believe it. Kalindi tries to make everyone aware of Robin's truth. Later, Robin tells Kalindi that he is Brahmarakshas. A revelation about Brahmarakshas takes place while Angad announces his intention to marry Kalindi. Along with the kids, Kalindi makes a plan against Brahmarakshas. Due to Brahmarakshas, Kalindi gets proven wrong before Angad during the sangeet ceremony. Later, Angad sets the ‘granth’ on fire. Kalindi decides to sacrifice herself to save Robin. During Minty's haldi ceremony, Angad suspects that Kalindi has made a plan and asks her to tell the truth. Later, Brahmarakshas accepts Kalindi's condition. Kalindi saves Robin and puts an end to Brahmarakshas. Later, she falls prey to Prithvi's plan. And is later declared dead.

2 years later 
A secret agent is revealed and a new story begins.

In Delhi, a girl named Chandni steals a necklace and reaches Ambala. It is revealed that Chandni is the twin sister of Kalindi, who is also born in Rohini. As she steps on the ash of Brahmarakshas, it becomes alive again and kidnaps Chandni believing she is Kalindi to marry her. Soon, Kalindi is revealed to be alive as well. The Brahmarakshas gains control over Inspector Yug. Posing as her twin Kalindi, Chandni returns with Angad, who discerns that Chandni is not Kalindi. Meanwhile, Prithvi and Shalini try to kill Chandni. Iravat foils Guru Ma's attempt to release Kalindi. He learns Kalindi and Chandni's truth from her and informs Yug. Meanwhile, Chandni's bravery impresses Angad. Later, Yug locates Chandni and attempts to arrest her, only to be stopped by Angad. Chandni prepares for Ishaan and Sona's wedding. Yug gets Kalindi home and Guru Ma vows to save her from Yug and Iravat's clutches. Angad senses that Kalindi is nearby, while Guru Ma helps her escape from the house.

Sona and Ishaan's haldi ceremony begins. Prithvi tells Yug that an impostor is staying at his house. Prithvi then abducts Chandini and hands her over to Yug. On learning about it, Angad rescues Chandini and brings her home. Chandini tries to win Angad's heart but he asks her to leave the house. Robin and Minty give a piece of good news to the family. They tell the family that Minty is pregnant, resulting in Angad stopping Chandni from leaving the house. Later, suspicious of Yug, Angad reaches his house to seek the truth and is attacked by Iravat. Yug lies to Kalindi about her past. At the hospital, Kalindi helps Angad but fails to recognise him. A girl discovers the truth about Yug and Kalindi brings her home. At the hospital, one of the nurses tells Kalindi about a job. At home, Chandini gives a surprise to Angad and proposes to him. Angad doesn't give her an answer but after she risks her life to save his life he changes his mind, post which they get engaged. Posing as Minty's nurse, Kalindi sees her picture in the house. Chandini tries to see Minti's nurse's face. Later, Kalindi's clothes catch fire during Holika Dahan. Yug gets shocked on seeing Kalindi at Angad's house. He puts forth a condition before Prithvi, who plots to get Minty's nurse fired. Angad goes to the hospital to solve a mystery. Kalindi learns that Chandni is her twin. Brahmarakshas tries to kill Angad, but in vain. Later, Kalindi and Chandni join forces and kill Brahmarakshas. Chandni dies sacrificing her life for Kalindi and Angad. Angad and Kalindi unite. After sometime, Angad and Kalindi look at the sky together. They smile and see the broken star and pray.

Meanwhile, the Brahmarakshas becomes alive again and roars, looking out for a powerful body to possess.

Cast

Season 1

Main
 Krystle D'Souza as Raina Shrivastava: Rishabh's wife; Suresh's adoptive daughter 
 Aham Sharma as Rishabh Shrivastava/Narsimha: Raina's husband; Sudha and Ashish's son; Mohini's foster-son; Rakhi's brother  
 Parag Tyagi as Sanjay Thakur/Brahmarakshas: Aparajita's husband

Recurring
 Rakshanda Khan as Mohini Shrivastava: Yug's mother; Aditya and Aparajita's sister; Rishabh and Rakhi's aunt and stepmother
 Kishwer Merchant as Aparajita Thakur/Brahmarakshas: Sanjay's wife and killer; Mohini and Aditya's sister
 Shailesh Datar as Nalin Shrivastava: Rishabh, Yug and Rakhi's father; Mohini's husband
 Amisha Shrivastava as Mishri Ranwaonkar
 Karan Chhabra as Shivam Singh Chhabra: Phooli's son; Raina's lover and helper
 Rishabh Shukla as Thakur Aditya Nigam: Mohini and Aparajita's brother; Mitali and Ved's father
 Abhaas Mehta as Yug Shrivastava: Nalin and Mohini's son; Rishabh and Rakhi's stepbrother; Naina's husband
 Ojaswi Oberoi as Naina Shrivastava: Yug's wife
 Kunal Vohra as Vedaaksh "Ved" Nigam: Aditya's son; Mitali's brother
 Srishti Maheshwari as Mitali Nigam: Aditya's daughter; Ved's sister
 Sonia Rakkar as Gayatri Malhotra 
 Sahil Uppal as Ajay Malhotra 
 Karan Sharma as Anil Malhotra
 Charu Mehra as Rakhi Shrivastava: Rishabh's sister; Sudha's daughter
 Shahab Khan as Sunil Munshi
 Apara Mehta as Jasmeet Shrivastava/Jassi/Dadi Bua
 Nikunj Malik as Kiara Sareen
 Alefia Kapadia as Kammo
 Manorama Bhattishyam as Phooli Singh Chhabra: Shivam's mother
 Mridul Das as Shyam
 Udit Shukla as Varun
 Komal Sharma as Sudha Shrivastava, Ashish's wife, Rishabh and Rakhi's mother
 Sunil Bob as Baba
 Unknown as Kanakraj, Mohini's helper

Season 2

Main 
 Nikki Sharma as Kalindi Angad Mehra (née Sharma): Vishaka and Raghav's foster daughter and Minty's foster sister; Angad's love interest and later his wife (2020–21)
 as Chandni: Kalindi's twin sister. She sacrifices her life for her twin sister Kalindi and her lover Angad (2020–21) (deceased)
Pearl V Puri as Angad Mehra: Shakti and Damini's son; Robin's brother and Kalindi's love interest turned husband (2020–21)
Vaidehi Nair as Minty Sharma: Raghav and Vishakha's younger daughter; Kalindi's foster sister; Robin's love interest-turned-wife (2020–21)
Rohit Choudhary as Robin Mehra: Shakti and Damini's younger son; Angad's younger brother; Minty's love interest-turned-husband (2020–21)
Chetan Hansraj as Vardaan Chaudhary/Brahmarakshas (2020)
Neel Motwani as Madan Srivastav: A priest who wants to kill Brahmarakshas, Angad and Kalindi's friend (2020) (deceased)
Leenesh Mattoo as Siddharth: Vikram's son; Sakshi's husband (2020–21)
Arpit Ranka as Yug Suryavanshi (2021) (deceased)

Recurring 
Mihir Mishra as Raghav Sharma: Kalindi's adoptive father and Minty's father; Vishakha's husband (2020)
Ekta Sharma as Vishakha Sharma: Kalindi's adoptive mother and Minty's mother; Raghav's wife (2020)
Aashish Kaul as Shakti Mehra: Angad and Robin's father; Raghav's best friend (2020–21)
Roma Bali as Damini Mehra: Shakti's wife; Angad and Robin's mother (2020–21)
Nikhil Arya as Prithvi Sharma: Shalini's husband; Paridhi, Sakshi and Raunak's father (2020–21)
Papiya Sengupta as Shalini Sharma: Prithvi's wife; Paridhi, Sakshi and Raunak's mother (2020–21)
Hemant Choudhary as Balan: Raghav's servant (2020–21)
Rupa Divetia as Gehna: Jwala's helper before 16 years; Tantrik's lover and wife; Vardaan's helper (2020)
Manish Khanna as Tantrik Jwala; Gehna's lover and husband: Brahmarakshas killed him  (2020)
Shivani Jha as Sakshi Sharma: Prithvi and Shalini's daughter; Siddharth's wife (2020–21)
Aafreen Dabestani as Paridhi "Pari" Sharma: Prithvi and Shalini's elder daughter; Siddharth's ex-girlfriend, Angad's ex-fiancée (2020–21)
Aanchal Srivastava as Raunak Sharma: Prithvi and Shalini's younger daughter (2020–21)
Kalyani Chaitanya as Gurumaaa (future predictor)
Ahmad Harhash as Ravi Singh Rathore

Production

Casting
Pearl V Puri was selected to play the male lead and Nikki Sharma was cast to play the female lead for the second season of the show.Chetan Hansraj was selected to play the titular role of the show.

Reception

Critical response (season 1)
Times Of India stated, "The show definitely has a gripping storyline, and the viewers just don't know what to expect next. It's fast-paced, edgy and doesn't give you time to think".

Ratings

See also
 List of Hindi horror shows

References

External links 

 Zee TV Official website on ZEE5
 Zee TV on YouTube
 Zee Entertainment Enterprises Limited
 Brahmarakshas on ZEE5
 Brahmarakshas 2 on ZEE5

Balaji Telefilms television series
2016 Indian television series debuts
Indian fantasy television series
Indian drama television series
2017 Indian television series endings
Hindi-language television shows
Indian supernatural television series
Zee TV original programming
Television shows set in Uttar Pradesh
Hindu mythology in popular culture